The Death Disc: A Story of the Cromwellian Period is a 1909 American short film, directed by D. W. Griffith and based on Mark Twain's short story "The Death Disk" .

Summary
An early Biograph historical drama set in Cromwellian England. A soldier, about to be executed because of his religious beliefs, is saved at the last moment through a twist of fate.

Cast
 George Nichols
 Marion Leonard
 Edith Haldeman
 Frank Powell
 James Kirkwood, Sr.
 Linda Arvidson
 Charles Craig
 Adele DeGarde
 Frank Evans
 Ruth Hart
 Arthur V. Johnson
 Jeanie MacPherson
 Owen Moore
 Anthony O'Sullivan
 Gertrude Robinson
 Mack Sennett
 Dorothy West

Bibliography

External links

 
D. W. Griffith at http://www.buscabiografias.com

1909 films
American black-and-white films
American silent short films
Films directed by D. W. Griffith
American biographical drama films
1909 drama films
1909 short films
Films set in England
Films set in the 1640s
Films with screenplays by Frank E. Woods
1900s biographical films
1900s American films
Silent American drama films